"You Gotta Get a Gimmick", also known as "You Gotta Have a Gimmick", is a song from the 1959 musical Gypsy, with music by Jule Styne and lyrics by Stephen Sondheim.

Synopsis
TheaterMania describes the song plot as a "threesome of hilariously costumed veteran burlesque dancers...who teach Louise the ropes of stripping."

Critical reception
New City Stage describes it as "endearingly bawdy." Time Out Chicago said the song is "this production’s hands-down highlight...in which three burlesque vets pull out all the stops." Stage and Cinema wrote the song was performed by the "show-stopping, scene-stealing...Tessie Tura, Mazeppa and Electra, the stripper specialists in 'You Gotta Get a Gimmick,'" adding, "It's the ultimate tribute to Darwinian adaptation, the secret of showbiz survival and even success." CurtainUp said the song is "show-stopping" and "outrageously funny." TheaterMania  called the song "scene-stealing." NipperTown described it as a "novelty song." Spokesman named it a "showstopper."

References

1959 songs
Songs from Gypsy (musical)
Songs with music by Jule Styne
Songs written by Stephen Sondheim